Christiaan David "Chris" Berger (27 April 1911 – 12 September 1965) was a Dutch athlete, competing in the sprints.

Career
Berger was a football player and changed to running after winning a 100 national title among footballers. In 1930 he ran his best 200 m time (21.1 s), which would remain the European record until 1951 and the Dutch national record until 1965. His career highlights came in 1934, when he had equalled the world record on the 100 m (10.3 s) in Amsterdam. Later at the first European Championships in Athletics, he won both the 100 m and 200 m sprints and finished third with the Dutch team at the 4 × 100 m relay. Originally the jury had declared the German athlete Erich Borchmeyer as winner of the 100 m, which led to outrage among the spectators who had clearly seen Berger win the race. The jury was eventually convinced to delay its decision after the films of the finish would be available the next day, which showed Berger to have won indeed.

Berger participated twice at the Olympics without much success. Much was expected from the Dutch athletes in 1932, but after a 10-day voyage by boat and a week on the train they didn't play much of a role in Los Angeles. Berger was eliminated in both sprints in the semifinals. In 1936, Berger had passed his peak and was overshadowed in his own country by Tinus Osendarp and Wil van Beveren, while the Dutch relay team ended up dropping the baton in the finals.

Between 1930 and 1934 Chris Berger won eight Dutch titles, four in each sprint event. He ended his career in sports in 1943 and became supervisor of the Olympic Stadium in Amsterdam. He died in Amsterdam in 1965 and is buried at Zorgvlied cemetery. His daughter Elles was a popular presenter on Dutch television.

Competition record

References
 Heere, A. and Kappenburg, B. (2000) 1870 – 2000, 130 jaar atletiek in Nederland. Groenevelt b.v.
 Bijkerk, T. (2004) Olympisch Oranje. De Vrieseborch

External links
 Article on Berger (Dutch)

1911 births
1965 deaths
Athletes (track and field) at the 1932 Summer Olympics
Athletes (track and field) at the 1936 Summer Olympics
Dutch male sprinters
Olympic athletes of the Netherlands
World record setters in athletics (track and field)
Athletes from Amsterdam
European Athletics Championships medalists